Total Petroleum Ghana, formerly known as Mobil Oil Ghana Limited is a Ghanaian petroleum company. They are listed on the stock index of the Ghana Stock Exchange, the GSE All-Share Index. As of October 30, 2006 it operated 225 petrol stations across Ghana with a significant 28% of the market.

References

External links

Total Petroleum Ghana Official homepage
The Statesmanonline, 'Total Petroleum Ghana takes 28% of market share after merger', 30 Oct 2006, retrieved 19 Jan 2009
Total Petroleum Ghana at Alacrastore

Oil and gas companies of Ghana
TotalEnergies
Former ExxonMobil subsidiaries
Companies listed on the Ghana Stock Exchange